The 1979–80 NBA season was the Nuggets' 4th season in the NBA and 13th season as a franchise.

Draft picks

Roster

Regular season

Season standings

z - clinched division title
y - clinched division title
x - clinched playoff spot

Record vs. opponents

Game log

Player statistics

Awards and records

Transactions

References

See also
 1979-80 NBA season

Denver Nuggets seasons
Den
1979 in sports in Colorado
Denver Nugget